Jules Liam Bernard (born January 21, 2000) is an American professional basketball player for the Capital City Go-Go of the NBA G League. He played college basketball for the UCLA Bruins.

High school career
Bernard played basketball for Windward School in Los Angeles. As a junior, he averaged 25.3 points and 13.7 rebounds per game. In his senior season, Bernard averaged 26.4 points and 14.2 rebounds per game. He competed for the Compton Magic on the Amateur Athletic Union circuit. A consensus four-star recruit, he committed to playing college basketball for UCLA in October 2017 over offers from Kansas, USC, Oregon and Miami (Florida). He was attracted to the Bruins by their program's history and head coach Steve Alford being open to playing skilled freshmen.

College career
As a freshman at UCLA, Bernard averaged 7.6 points and 3.1 rebounds per game. In his sophomore season, he averaged 5.5 points and 2.6 rebounds per game. On March 3, 2021, he scored a career-high 23 points in an 82–72 loss to Oregon. As a junior, Bernard averaged 10.3 points and 5.1 rebounds per game.

In his senior year in 2021–22, he continued to decrease his turnovers after nearly committing twice as many turnovers as assists in his first two seasons. He had a season-high 22 points in each of the Bruins' two games against Long Beach State. Bernard ended the season with nine consecutive games scoring in double figures, including a team-high 16 points in UCLA's season-ending loss to North Carolina in the Sweet Sixteen of the 2022 NCAA tournament. As a senior, Bernard averaged 12.8 points and 4.7 rebounds per game.

After the season, he declared for the NBA draft, but did not hire an agent to maintain his college eligibility; the NCAA allowed an extra year due to the COVID-19 pandemic. He was invited to the NBA G League Elite Camp but did not receive an invitation to the NBA Draft Combine.  He had a workout with the Los Angeles Lakers before deciding to remain in the draft, minutes before the deadline to return to school.

Professional career

Motor City Cruise (2022)
After going undrafted in the 2022 NBA draft, Bernard played with the Detroit Pistons in the 2022 NBA Summer League. He scored in double digits once in the first four games before scoring a team-high 22 points in the finale, including 14 points in the third quarter. He was later added to the Pistons' training camp roster after signing an Exhibit 10 contract. Bernard played in three of the team's four preseason games before being released. He was later named to the training camp roster for the Motor City Cruise, the Pistons' G League affiliate.

Capital City Go-Go (2022–present)
On December 22, 2022, Bernard was traded from the Motor City to the Capital City Go-Go.

Career statistics

College

|-
| style="text-align:left;"| 2018–19
| style="text-align:left;"| UCLA
| 33 || 2 || 17.2 || .469 || .371 || .739 || 3.1 || .8 || .5 || .1 || 7.6
|-
| style="text-align:left;"| 2019–20
| style="text-align:left;"| UCLA
| 30 || 1 || 16.2 || .390 || .317 || .784 || 2.6 || .6 || .5 || .2 || 5.5
|-
| style="text-align:left;"| 2020–21
| style="text-align:left;"| UCLA
| 32 || 28 || 29.3 || .441 || .396 || .744 || 5.1 || 1.6 || .5 || .2 || 10.3
|-
| style="text-align:left;"| 2021–22
| style="text-align:left;"| UCLA
| 35 || 34 || 30.1 || .419 || .337 || .818 || 4.7 || 1.7 || 1.0 || .2 || 12.8
|- class="sortbottom"
| style="text-align:center;" colspan="2"| Career
| 130 || 65 || 23.4 || .430 || .354 || .774 || 3.9 || 1.2 || .6 || .2 || 9.2

Source:

References

External links

UCLA Bruins bio

2000 births
Living people
American men's basketball players
Basketball players from Los Angeles
American sportspeople of Trinidad and Tobago descent
UCLA Bruins men's basketball players
Shooting guards
Windward School alumni